Louise Bille-Brahe (1830–1910) was a Danish courtier; Overhofmesterinde (Mistress of the Robes) to the queen of Denmark, Louise of Hesse-Kassel, from 1888 to 1898, and to the next queen of Denmark, Louise of Sweden, from 1906 to 1910.

Born to baron Carl Hochschild and Emilia Catharina Oxholm, she married diplomat count Henrik Bille-Brahe in 1851.

References

 Dansk Adelskalender 
 http://runeberg.org/adelskal/1905/0505.html
 http://runeberg.org/dbl/2/0265.html

1830 births
1910 deaths
19th-century Danish people
Danish ladies-in-waiting
Mistresses of the Robes (Denmark)
19th-century Danish women
Bille family